The American Osteopathic Board of Radiology (AOBR) is an organization that provides board certification to qualified Doctors of Osteopathic Medicine (D.O.) who specialize in the use of imaging in the diagnosis and treatment of disease (radiologists). The board is one 18 medical specialty certifying boards of the American Osteopathic Association Bureau of Osteopathic Specialists approved by the American Osteopathic Association (AOA), and was established in 1939. The American Osteopathic Board of Radiology and the American Board of Radiology are the two certifying boards for radiologists in the United States. As of December 2011, 732 osteopathic radiologists held active certification with the AOBR. Radiologists board certified by the AOBR are eligible for membership in the American College of Radiology.

Board certification
Initial certification is available to osteopathic radiologists who have successfully completed an AOA-approved residency in diagnostic radiology or radiation oncology, two years of practice, and successful completion of oral and written exams.

Diplomates certified in diagnostic radiology or in radiation oncology prior to 2002 are eligible for voluntary recertification. Since 2002, the American Osteopathic Board of Radiology requires osteopathic radiologists to renew their certification every ten years to avoid expiration of their board certified status. Additionally, osteopathic radiologists who have completed the requirements set forth by the AOBR and completed an AOA-approved radiology residency may be eligible to pursue certification by the American Board of Radiology.

Osteopathic radiologists may also receive Certification of Added Qualifications (CAQ) in the following areas: 
Neuroradiology
Pediatric Radiology
Vascular & Interventional Radiology

See also
American Board of Radiology
American Osteopathic Association Bureau of Osteopathic Specialists
 American Osteopathic College of Radiology

References

External links
 AOBR homepage

Osteopathic medical associations in the United States
Scientific organizations established in 1939
Radiology organizations
1939 establishments in the United States
Medical and health organizations based in Missouri